Robert Maclay may refer to:

 Robert Samuel Maclay (1824–1907), American Christian missionary to the Far East
 Robert Maclay (merchant) (1834–1898), American merchant and businessman, with a son of the same name
 Robert Plunket Maclay (1820–1903), Confederate States Army officer